The 12379 / 12380 Jallianwalla Bagh Express is a Express train of the Indian Railways connecting  in West Bengal and  of Punjab. It is currently being operated with 12379/12380 train numbers on Friday of a week.

Service

The 12379 Jallianwala Bagh Express has an average speed of 62 km/hr and covers 1901 km in 30 hrs 35 mins. 12380 Jallianwala Bagh Express has an average speed of 62 km/hr and covers 1901 km in 30 hrs 35 mins.

Route & Halts

Coach composition

The train has standard LHB rakes with max speed of 120 kmph. The train consists of 22 coaches:

 1 AC First-class
 1 AC II Tier
 3 AC III Tier
 11 Sleeper coaches
1 Pantry car
 3 General
 2 EOGs

Traction

Both trains are hauled by a Howrah or Sealdah-based WAP-7 electric locomotive from Sealdah to Amritsar and vice versa.

Rake sharing

The train shares its rake with 12329/12330 West Bengal Sampark Kranti

See also 

 Sealdah railway station
 Amritsar Junction railway station
 West Bengal Sampark Kranti
 Tatanagar–Amritsar Jallianwalla Bagh Express

Notes

External links 

 12379/Jallianwalabagh Express
 12380/Jallianwalabagh Express

References 

Transport in Amritsar
Transport in Kolkata
Express trains in India
Rail transport in West Bengal
Rail transport in Jharkhand
Rail transport in Bihar
Rail transport in Uttar Pradesh
Rail transport in Delhi
Rail transport in Haryana
Rail transport in Punjab, India
Railway services introduced in 2009